Olivia Hastings Holt (born August 5, 1997) is an American actress and singer. She starred in the Disney XD series Kickin' It, Disney Channel Original Movie Girl vs. Monster, and the Disney Channel Original Series I Didn't Do It. From 2018 to 2019, she portrayed the titular role Tandy Bowen / Dagger in the Freeform series Cloak & Dagger. In 2021, she portrayed Kate Wallis in Cruel Summer.

Holt had voice roles in the films Tinker Bell and the Legend of the NeverBeast (2014) and Gnome Alone (2017), and starred in the feature films Class Rank (2017), Same Kind of Different as Me (2017), and Status Update (2018). Her debut EP, Olivia, was released on Hollywood Records on July 15, 2016.

Early life
Holt was born in Germantown, Tennessee, to Mark and Kim Holt. She has two siblings. At age three, her family moved to Nesbit, Mississippi, where she grew up after briefly living in Memphis, Tennessee. Growing up, she took gymnastics classes for seven years. In 2011, she moved to Los Angeles with her family. She graduated from Oak Park High School in 2015.

Career

Television
Holt began her acting career in local theater productions. She started appearing in television commercials at the age of 10, for products including Hasbro, Kidz Bop 14, Mattel, Bratz dolls, Littlest Pet Shop, and Girl Gourmet.

Possessing skills in gymnastics, Holt was cast in Disney XD's martial arts comedy Kickin' It, which premiered on June 13, 2011. She played the role of Kim in the series, as a main character in seasons 1–3, and as a special guest on three episodes in season 4. She starred in the 2012 Disney Channel Original Movie Girl vs. Monster, playing the lead character Skylar Lewis, a teenager who discovers that her family have long worked as monster hunters, and she is next in line. She left Kickin' It as a regular after season 3 to star in the Disney Channel half-hour comedy series I Didn't Do It, which premiered on January 17, 2014. The series follows five friends, including Holt's character, Lindy Watson, a nerdy, athletic, social outcast. The series ended on October 16, 2015, after two seasons. In January 2017, Holt was cast as Tandy Bowen / Dagger, one of the lead characters in the Freeform and Marvel Comics television series Cloak & Dagger. The series premiered in June 2018 and ran for two seasons until May 2019, after which it was canceled. Holt, along with her Cloak & Dagger co-star Aubrey Joseph, returned to voice their respective characters on the Disney XD animated series Spider-Man and reprised their roles for a two-episode stint in the third and final season of Runaways. Holt plays Kate Wallis on the series Cruel Summer, a psychological thriller set between 1993 and 1995 that premiered on Freeform on April 20, 2021.

Film
In November 2014, Holt joined the cast of the drama Same Kind of Different as Me, directed by Michael Carney and also starring Greg Kinnear and Renée Zellweger, who play her character's parents in the film. The film was released in October 2017. In November 2015, it was announced that Holt had been cast in a lead role in the indie comedy Class Rank, directed by Eric Stoltz. In May 2016, it was announced that she would star alongside Ross Lynch in Status Update, directed by Scott Speer, with filming to commence the following month in Vancouver, Canada.<ref>{{cite magazine |first=Pamela |last=McClintock |date=May 2, 2016 |url=https://www.hollywoodreporter.com/news/cannes-disney-channel-stars-ross-889445 |title=Cannes: Disney Channel Stars Ross Lynch, Olivia Holt Cast in Status Update' |magazine=The Hollywood Reporter}}</ref>

Music
Holt recorded three songs for the 2012 film Girl vs. Monster, in which she also starred. The songs were featured on the compilation Make Your Mark: Ultimate Playlist. She won a 2013 Radio Disney Music Award for Best Crush Song for "Had Me @ Hello", which was featured in the film. She also recorded a cover version of "Winter Wonderland" for the 2012 Disney Channel Holiday Playlist album. Her song "Carry On" was the theme song for the 2014 Disneynature film Bears.

In October 2014, Holt signed a record deal with Hollywood Records. Her debut single, "Phoenix", came out on May 13, 2016. The music video was released on June 23, 2016. Olivia, her debut EP, was released on July 15, 2016.Kristine Hope Kowalski (June 24, 2016), "Olivia Holt Reveals Her Debut EP's Release Date + Cover Art," Twist.

In 2016, Holt went on her first tour, the Rise of a Phoenix Tour, with Ryland Lynch, Isac Elliot and Forever in Your Mind. She and Forever in Your Mind also performed at the 2016 TJ Martell Family Foundation Day in Los Angeles on October 9, 2016.

In April 2017, she was picked as Elvis Duran's Artist of the Month appearing on NBC's Today show with Hoda Kotb and Kathie Lee Gifford performing her hit "History". Her single "Generous", which was written by Fransisca Hall and MoZella, was released on September 22, 2017. The song's music video was directed by Chris Applebaum. "Generous" reached number 1 on the Billboard Dance Club Songs chart. In 2018, she collaborated with Martin Jensen on "16 Steps" and with Nicky Romero on "Distance". The same year, she released the single "Bad Girlfriend".

Her 2020 single "Love U Again" featuring R3hab reached number 40 on the Billboard Hot Dance / Electronic Songs chart. It was followed by "Take Me Out of It" later that year. Through early 2021 she released the singles "Do You Miss Me" and "Love On You". She also covered The Smashing Pumpkins song "Today" for the TV series in which she stars Cruel Summer''. On June 11, 2021, a compilation EP called "In My Feelings" was released, containing her previous released singles. On June 25, 2021, she released the single "Next", co-written with Meghan Trainor.

Holt parted ways with Hollywood Records in November 2021.

Endorsements
In 2013, Holt partnered with mobile gaming system maker PlayMG as a spokesperson and part owner, to help the company develop new versions of its app-based games. She was announced as a brand ambassador for Neutrogena in March 2016.

Filmography

Discography

Extended plays

Singles

As featured artist

Promotional singles

Other charted songs

Other appearances

Music videos

Awards and nominations

References

External links
 
 
 

1997 births
Living people
Actresses from Mississippi
Actresses from Tennessee
American child actresses
American television actresses
People from Nesbit, Mississippi
People from Germantown, Tennessee
People from Tennessee
21st-century American actresses
Artists from Tennessee
Hollywood Records artists
American women pop singers
21st-century American women singers
21st-century American singers